The Sicán National Museum is a museum in Ferreñafe, Peru, which opened in 2004.

The museum documents the ancient Sican culture.

See also 
 List of museums in Peru

References

External links
 Official website

Museums in Peru
Museums established in 2004
Buildings and structures in Lambayeque Region
Tourist attractions in Lambayeque Region
2004 establishments in Peru